Vila Operária da Gamboa (English: Workers' Village of Gamboa) is an apartment building in Rio de Janeiro, Brazil. It is located in the Santo Cristo neighborhood near the Gamboa waterfront area of the city. It was designed by Lúcio Costa (1902-1998) in 1931 during his three-year partnership with Gregori Warchavchik, and completed in 1933. The goal of modernists in Brazil was to build for the working class, and Vila Operária Gamboa is the first modernist building constructed for the poor in Brazil.

Vila Operária da Gamboa was built on a narrow, irregular parcel of land. It is located on the north side of Rua Barão da Gamboa at the intersection of Rua Cardoso Marinho on land ceded to the project by Dr. Fábio Carneiro de Mendoça. The technology for modern construction was at an early stage in Brazil and workers in Rio de Janeiro lacked the technical skills to work with concrete, steel, and stone. Warchavchik brought workers from his modernist projects in São Paulo to complete the building.

The structure consists of fourteen units on two floor. The façade of the building was painted in vivid green and tan with the walkway banister painted in white. In its style it resembles early 20th-century residences of Louis Bourgeois and Cliff May.

Vila Operária da Gamboa remains standing but is in a state of advanced dilapidation. It is a listed building of the City of Rio de Janeiro (Bens Tombados No Município Do Rio De Janeiro), designated as such in 1986.

References

Apartment buildings
Lúcio Costa buildings
Buildings and structures completed in 1933
Modernist architecture in Brazil
1933 establishments in Brazil